Mitrella tenebrosa is a species of sea snail in the family Columbellidae, the dove snails. Its specific name tenebrosa refers to its dark colour.

Distribution and habitat
The species is endemic São Tomé Island where it may occur at depths greater than 15–20 m.

References

tenebrosa
Endemic fauna of São Tomé Island
Invertebrates of São Tomé and Príncipe
Gastropods described in 2005